Michael O'Brien (born 23 December 1969) is an Irish fencer. He competed in the individual épée event at the 1992 Summer Olympics.

References

External links
 

1969 births
Living people
Irish male épée fencers
Olympic fencers of Ireland
Fencers at the 1992 Summer Olympics
20th-century Irish people